Ram Singh (28 July 1730 – September 1772), was the Raja of Marwar Kingdom, also called Jodhpur State. He ruled 18 June 1749 – July 1751, and 31 January 1753 – September 1772.

He succeeded on the death of his father, Abhai Singh, on 18 June 1749. However, he was defeated in battle by his uncle Bakht Singh at Luniawas on 27 November 1750, and was expelled from Jodhpur. He sought refuge in Jaipur in July 1751. In 1753, he reascended the gadi for the second time after deposing Maharaja Vijay Singh, his cousin.

Ram Singh died at Jaipur in September 1772. He was succeeded by Vijay Singh, who then became Maharaja for the second time himself.

See also
Rulers of Marwar

References

1730 births
1772 deaths
Monarchs of Marwar